Mörsils IF is an active sports club located in Mörsil in Åre Municipality, Jämtland County, Sweden. Boström is a famous Mörsil family.

Background
Mörsils Idrottsförening has sections covering football, bandy, table tennis, skiing and also has sections and activities for gymnastics, tennis, badminton, skating activities and a Sports School for 6 to 15 year olds.

The Sports Hall was built by Mörsil IF in 1987 and can accommodate most indoor sports.  There is also an outdoor ice rink and a small swimming pool.

Mörsils IF currently plays in Division 4 Jämtland/Härjedalen which is the sixth tier of Swedish football. They play their home matches at the Bleckåsvallen IP in Mörsil.

The club is affiliated to Jämtland-Härjedalens Fotbollförbund.

Season to season

Footnotes

External links
 Mörsils IF – Official website

Sport in Jämtland County
Football clubs in Jämtland County